Rashida Jones is an American actress, writer, and producer, best known for starring on the NBC comedy series Parks and Recreation (2009–2015) as Ann Perkins, and as Karen Filippelli in The Office (2006–2009; 2011).

Jones first role of prominence was as Louisa Fenn on the Fox drama series Boston Public (2000–2002). From 2016 to 2019, Jones starred as the lead eponymous role in the TBS comedy series Angie Tribeca.

In film, Jones has appeared in I Love You, Man (2009), The Social Network (2010) and Celeste and Jesse Forever (2012), which she co-wrote. Jones also co-wrote the story of Toy Story 4 (2019).

As a filmmaker, she directed the first episode of Hot Girls Wanted, a series that focused on the sex industry. She was also executive producer of the series. In 2018, her documentary Quincy, about her father, Quincy Jones, debuted on Netflix; it won the Grammy Award for Best Music Film in 2019.

Filmography

Film

Television

Director

Music videos

References

External links
 Rashida Jones at IMDb

Actress filmographies
American filmographies